A stereotype is a simplified generalization about members of a group.

Stereotype(s) may also refer to:
Stereotype (printing), a duplicate of a typographical element
Stereotype (UML), an extensibility mechanism of Unified Modeling Language
"Stereotypes" (song), a 1996 Britpop single by Blur
The Stereotypes, a music production group
A 1980 ska single by The Specials on More Specials
Stereotype (album), a 2022 album by Cole Swindell
Stereotype (EP), EP by STAYC
"Stereotype" (STAYC song)
"Stereotypes", a song by Reks from More Grey Hairs, 2009

See also
Stereo Type, a 2005 experimental composition by Guto Puw
Stereotypy (disambiguation)
stereoscopy 
stereoscope